Hankamer is an unincorporated populated place in northern Chambers County, Texas, United States. It is located northeast of Lake Anahuac adjacent to Wallisville on Highway 61.

Historical development
In the spring of 1904, a post office was established at Hankamer with Ira Alvan Hankamer (1869-1945) designated as postmaster on May 24. The town took his name. Ira was a son of settler John William Hankamer (1834 - 1907) who arrived in Texas in 1845 with his brothers Charles and Frederick, mother Johannette, and stepfather John Stengler, who sailed on the Harriet from Prussia to Galveston. They became citizens of the Republic of Texas. The Hankamers and Stenglers had planned to settle in the New Braunfels - Fredericksburg area, but news of Indian trouble prompted them to choose the area north of Anahuac.  A grandson of Ira A. Hankamer currently resides in his old house at Hankamer.

This town was named after I. A. Hankamer, an early settler to the area. In 1900 the Hankamer-Stowell Canal Company (also called Farmers Canal Company) started the area rice farming which would transform the surrounding region. Within two years, 10,000 acres (40 km) of rice fields would be irrigated. The Hankamer post office was opened in 1904. In 1929, oil was discovered nearby in Liberty County which would boost the population. In addition to the exploration for oil and gas establishing new oilfields, a lumbermill would provide employment.

Education
Anahuac Independent School District operates schools in the area.

References

External links

 

Unincorporated communities in Chambers County, Texas
Unincorporated communities in Texas
Greater Houston